The Grand Metropolitan of the East may refer to:
Patriarch of the Church of the East
Maphrian

See also
Catholicos